is a Japanese science fiction writer and aesthetic Yaoi novelist. Noah was born in 1954, and made a debut in the S-F Magazine in 1979. His real name and the identity are not in public. He is a member of the Science Fiction and Fantasy Writers of Japan.

Biography 
Noah was born in Fukuoka city, Fukuoka prefecture in 1954, as a son of Japanese mystery writer Eitarō Ishizawa (石沢英太郎, 1916–1988). He graduated from the Department of Literature of the Seinan Gakuin University in 1979.

He won the Prize, First rank, in the 5th Hayakawa SF Contest with the story "Hana Kariudo" (The Flower Hunter), which he wrote while he was a student in the University. Noah made a debut with this story in the SF-Magazine in the same year.

He is a Japanese SF writer of the 4th generation. There are other 4th generation SF writers such as Chōhei Kambayashi and Mariko Ōhara, Noah debuted contemporarily with them.

Noah's style of stories are highly aesthetic, splendid and stylish. Noah was thought as a female by many people at first, due to his visionary style and the pen name "Adusa". Adusa is usually female name.

He is familiar with shōjo manga, especially the works by the Year 24 Group. Also his works are characterized by the aesthetic style and have inclination to shōnen-ai situations and world. Thus, aesthetic Yaoi writer Shikiko Yamaai (JA) is his friend. Under the influence of Yamaai and other Yaoi writers, Noah began criticisms of Yaoi and writing Yaoi stories in 1992 Some of his works are fantastic, aesthetic Yaoi novel with sci-fi, occult elements.

Style of works 
Noah's style is highly aesthetic and splendid with visual depiction. Fantastic and Visionary. His world of fictions ranges from the terrorist fighting with the Galactic Empire, speculative visions of far future Galaxy, and shōnen-ai situations in this stage, Golden Dawn Magics and quantum, psychonic computer, celestial chasing drama of angel and cosmic stranger, occult fantasy, the secret of William Shakespeare and his work Hamlet, to the speculative and sci-fi Yaoi world. Noah is the novelist of refined style, shining pedantry and metafictional fantasy.

Some profiles 
 The pseudonym "Adusa Noah" came from "Noah's Ark". It is a word game. In alphabetic order, 1st letter is "A", 18th letter is "R", and 11th letter is "K", thus ARK is correspondent to "ATsuSa". In classic Japanese, voiced letter such as "du" is written as "tsu".
 Some of Noah's works have subtitle. These subtitles are parody of the titles of the James Joyce's novels.

Works

Novels 
Titles with plus symbol (+) are hard-bound book. Titles with asterisk (*) are Bunko-bon.
 , 1984, 
 , 1984, 
 , 1986, 
 , 1988, 
 , 1991,
 , 1992,
 , 1993,
 , 1993, 
 , 1994, 
 , 1995, 
 , 1996, 
 , 1996, 
 , 1998, 
 , 2001, 
 , 2008, 
 , 2018,

Critiques 
 Commentary to Japanesque SF  (、Japanesuku SF Shiron), 1993 
 "Mystery" for Flowering Girls (Hanasaku Otometachi no "Misuterii"), 1995

Notes and references

References 
 (ja) Masao Azuma & Ran Ishidō Nihon Gensō Sakka Jiten, Kokusho Kankokai, (2009),  p. 535
 (ja) Noah's Web Site Archive provides many essays and reviews which have been published in various commercial magazines etc.
 SFWJ site
 Noah's Web Site - English version

1954 births
Living people
Japanese science fiction writers
People from Fukuoka
Seinan Gakuin University alumni